David Johnson (born 16 September 1969) is an Australian Paralympic tennis player.  He won a silver medal at the 2000 Sydney Games in the Men's Doubles event.

 David Jonson also likes  NRL his favourite team is the Brisbane broncos

References

External links 

 
 

1969 births
Living people
Australian male tennis players
Australian wheelchair tennis players
Wheelchair category Paralympic competitors
Paralympic wheelchair tennis players of Australia
Paralympic medalists in wheelchair tennis
Paralympic silver medalists for Australia
Wheelchair tennis players at the 2000 Summer Paralympics
Medalists at the 2000 Summer Paralympics
Tennis people from Queensland